The 2020 United States presidential election in Pennsylvania was held on Tuesday, November 3, 2020, as part of the 2020 United States presidential election in which all 50 states plus the District of Columbia participated. Pennsylvania voters chose electors to represent them in the Electoral College via a popular vote, pitting the Republican Party's nominee, President Donald Trump, and running mate Vice President Mike Pence against Democratic Party nominee, former Vice President Joe Biden, and his running mate California Senator Kamala Harris. Pennsylvania has 20 electoral votes in the Electoral College.

Although Trump had won the state in 2016 by a narrow margin of 0.72%, Biden was able to reclaim the state, winning it by a similarly narrow 1.17% margin. Because of the way the state counted in-person ballots first, Trump started with a wide lead on election night. However, over the next few days, Biden greatly closed the margin due to outstanding votes from Democratic-leaning areas, most notably Philadelphia and Pittsburgh, as well as mail-in ballots from all parts of the state which strongly favored him. On the morning of November 6, election-calling organization Decision Desk HQ forecast that Biden had won Pennsylvania's 20 electoral votes, and with them the election. The following morning, November 7, during a Trump campaign press conference outside a Philadelphia landscaping business, nearly all major news organizations followed suit and called Pennsylvania for Biden, proclaiming him President-elect.

One key to Biden's success in the state was his improvement on Hillary Clinton's margins in the large Philadelphia-area suburban counties: he won Bucks by 3.60% more than Clinton did, Delaware by 4.38% more, Montgomery by 4.80% more, and Chester—which Mitt Romney had narrowly won just eight years prior—by 6.60% more. At the same time, he reclaimed two of the three large industrial counties which had voted Democratic for at least six consecutive elections before Trump flipped them in 2016: Erie and Northampton. While Trump prevailed in the third, Luzerne County, he did so by a reduced margin with respect to 2016; and Biden increased the margin of victory in his birth county, Lackawanna County, which Trump had nearly flipped in 2016. Biden halted the four-election Democratic slide in formerly traditionally Democratic Westmoreland County, where, before 2020, Al Gore had been the last Democrat to improve on the previous nominee's vote share (and which had given Trump his margin in the state in 2016). He also improved on Clinton's margins in Lehigh County by 2.9% and won Allegheny County with the largest percentage of the vote since 1988. However, Biden's vote share in Philadelphia County actually declined slightly compared to Hillary Clinton's, although he still outperformed either Al Gore in 2000 or John Kerry in 2004 in the county. Biden would also become the first Democratic candidate running for president to garner at least 100,000 votes in the Republican stronghold county of Lancaster. He also became the second presidential candidate since 1964, the last time the county voted for a Democrat, to get at least 40% of the vote. This was due to the large number of votes Biden received from the city of Lancaster and a competitive margin in voting precincts in and around Lititz and Columbia. 

Despite Biden's victory, Pennsylvania weighed in for this election as 3.28% more Republican than the national average. This is the second consecutive presidential election in which Pennsylvania voted to the right of the nation. Previously, it had not done so since 1948.

With Ohio, Florida, and Iowa backing the losing candidate for the first time since 1960, 1992, and 2000 respectively, this election established Pennsylvania, Wisconsin, and Michigan as the states with the longest bellwether streak still in effect today. The last time any of them voted against the winning candidate was 2004, when all three voted for the losing Democrat John Kerry.

Biden became the first Democrat to win the White House without carrying Luzerne County since Harry Truman in 1948. This was the first election since 1932 that the county voted for the statewide loser.

Primary elections
The primary elections were originally scheduled for April 28, 2020, also originally joining several northeastern states in holding primaries on the same date, including Connecticut, Delaware, Maryland, New York, and Rhode Island. On March 26, Pennsylvania joined several other states in moving its primary to June 2 due to the COVID-19 pandemic.

Republican primary
Even though the Republican National Committee mailed Pennsylvania voters encouraging mail-in voting, describing it as a "convenient and secure” option, most Republicans expressed opposition to the prospect. Earlier, the Republican-controlled House blocked a proposal to mail every Pennsylvanian a mail-in ballot application. This was in response to President Trump's skepticism of the practice, expressing concern mail-in voting may result in voter fraud that would potentially benefit the Democratic Party.

Trump was declared the winner in the Republican primary, and received all of the state's 34 pledged delegates to the 2020 Republican National Convention (the state also has 54 unpledged delegates).

Democratic primary

Green Caucus
The Green Caucus was held during April 2020 and was won by Howie Hawkins.

General election

Final predictions

Polling

Graphical summary

Aggregate polls

2020 polls

2017–2019 polls

Former candidates and hypothetical polling 

Donald Trump vs. Michael Bloomberg

Donald Trump vs. Pete Buttigieg

Donald Trump vs. Kamala Harris

Donald Trump vs. Amy Klobuchar

Donald Trump vs. Beto O'Rourke

Donald Trump vs. Bernie Sanders

Donald Trump vs. Elizabeth Warren

Donald Trump vs. Generic Democrat

Donald Trump vs. Generic Opponent

Electoral slates
These slates of electors were nominated by each party in order to vote in the Electoral College should their candidates win the state:

Results

9,098,998 residents registered to vote by the voter registration deadline on October 15, which had been extended from its original date on October 13 by court order.

Results by county

Counties that flipped from Republican to Democratic
 Erie (largest municipality: Erie)
 Northampton (largest municipality: Bethlehem)

By congressional district
Biden and Trump both won half of the 18 congressional districts in Pennsylvania, including each winning one held by the opposite party.

Voter demographics

Analysis 
Throughout the year, Pennsylvania was regarded as the most important (or likely tipping-point) state in the entire election; Pennsylvania had 20 electoral votes, and it was one of the closest states of the 2016 presidential election. Both candidates aggressively played for the state; Trump needed the state as it represented his narrow path to re-election, while Biden needed the state to rebuild the blue wall, which Trump had broken in 2016 by carrying the northern industrial states of Michigan, Pennsylvania, and Wisconsin.

Historically, Pennsylvania has usually been a competitive state. During the Second Party System from 1828 to 1852, it voted for the winner of every election. From the Civil War on, it has generally had a partisan lean; during the Third and Fourth Party Systems, Pennsylvania was a classic Yankee Republican state. When Franklin Roosevelt carried it in 1936, he became the first Democrat in eighty years to do so. Between 1936 and 1988, neither major party carried Pennsylvania for more than three straight presidential elections, although between 1952 and 1988, it voted Democratic in every close election (1960, 1968, 1976), and consistently voted more Democratic than the nation. Starting in 1992, Pennsylvania became part of the blue wall—the group of states that voted Democratic for six straight elections from 1992 through 2012. In 2016, it was one of three blue wall states that Trump won on his way to an upset victory.

State Republicans sought to require that only mail-in ballots received by Election Day be counted. The Commonwealth's Supreme Court rejected their demands, deciding that, due to probable delays due to the ongoing coronavirus and U.S. Postal Service crisis, ballots received up to three days after Election Day would also be counted. Republicans then appealed the decision to the U.S. Supreme Court. Supreme Court justices produced a 4–4 tie (as the late Ruth Bader Ginsburg's seat remained vacant when the ruling was issued), with Chief Justice John Roberts siding with the three liberal justices, allowing the state supreme court decision to stand.

Biden's winning margin in Pennsylvania was somewhat smaller than that of other Democrats who had carried the state in recent close elections. His margin of 1.2% was less than a third that of Al Gore's 4.2% margin in 2000, and less than a fourth that of Barack Obama's 5.4% margin in 2012. It was closer to John Kerry's margin of 2.5% in 2004, although, because Kerry was losing the overall national popular vote by 2.4%, his win made Pennsylvania almost 5% bluer than the country in 2004. In contrast, Pennsylvania remained redder than the country in 2020 even as Biden won it, by about 3.3%. As in Michigan and Wisconsin, Biden ran behind Barack Obama's performances in 2008 and 2012, though he received more votes total in the state this cycle due to record-breaking turnout. 

As for Trump, he easily set the record for total number of votes for a Republican candidate in Pennsylvania history (as with Biden, largely due to record-breaking turnout). With 48.84% of the vote, he did slightly outpace both his own vote share in 2016 (48.18%) and George W. Bush's in 2004 (48.42%), the latter of which had previously stood as the highest Republican vote share in the state since 1988.

Joe Biden's strongest base of support was the Philadelphia metro area. In the city of Philadelphia itself, Biden won by 63.4%, a weaker win than Hillary Clinton's 66.9% margin in the city in 2016, but still better than Kerry's 61.1% margin in 2004 or Gore's 62.0% margin in 2000. Donald Trump improved his vote share in Philadelphia by 2.5%, and, as of the counting on November 8, held a majority of the vote in the 26th, 58th, and 66th wards. However, Biden improved on Hillary Clinton dramatically in the Main Line counties of Montgomery and Chester, as well as, to a lesser extent, Delaware, increasing the Democratic vote share in these counties by 4.2%, 5.9%, and 3.5%, respectively, and winning them all by double digits. Before 1992, all three had been Republican strongholds in the state, and Chester had been considered a swing county as recently as 2012, when Romney narrowly carried it, but all three have drifted towards the Democratic column, as they tend to be socially liberal.

Biden also performed strongly in Pennsylvania's other urban, suburban, and exurban areas. Crucially, he carried Allegheny County (Pittsburgh) by 20.4%, the widest margin any nominee had won the county by since 1992. Centre and Dauphin both remained in the Democratic column; in the past, these counties voted Republican, though Centre County is home to Pennsylvania State University, while Dauphin County has followed the trend of urban areas becoming more Democratic. Biden also narrowly reclaimed two counties anchored by industrial cities which had long voted Democratic before Trump flipped them in 2016, Northampton (Bethlehem) and Erie (Erie), and improved on Hillary Clinton's margin in his birth county of Lackawanna County (Scranton), a county Hillary Clinton had barely kept in the Democratic column in 2016. In suburban Cumberland County, adjacent to Harrisburg, Biden shaved Trump's margin from 17.8% to 10.5%. Northampton and Erie were the only counties to flip from one party to the other; Northampton has voted for the winner of the state in every election from 1952 on.

Trump maintained much of his momentum throughout rural and industrial Pennsylvania from four years earlier, with convincing victories in counties that were once competitive or even Democratic-leaning. He kept Luzerne County (Wilkes-Barre), which had voted Democratic six elections in a row before 2016 (and which had voted with the winner of the state from 1936 through 2016), in his column, although his margin in it was cut from 19.3% to 14.3%. Trump also won the former Democratic stronghold of Westmoreland County, although his margin in this county, crucial to his win in 2016, declined. Other previously competitive counties that Trump performed well in included Berks and Cambria, both of which voted for Obama in 2008. Trump further ran up the score in other conservative exurban counties, most notably in Lancaster and Lebanon counties, though his margin shrank somewhat in both.

Trump won whites in the state by 15 points, although like in the rest of the country, there was a clear disparity between college-educated and non college-educated whites. Biden won whites with a college degree by 9 points, while Trump excelled with whites without a college degree, winning this group by 32 points. Additionally, there was a gender disparity with the white vote; Trump won white men by 15 points, but only carried white women by 3 points. Finally, there was an age gap; Biden won young voters by double-digit margins, whereas Trump performed strongly with middle-aged voters; senior citizens were more even, breaking slightly for Trump.

Within minority blocs, Biden fared well, as he won black voters by 87 points, and won Latinos by 42 points. Three other critical voting blocs broke for Biden this cycle; he won independent voters by 8 points, moderates by 17 points, and first-time voters by 23 points.

Aftermath 
On November 24, 2020, the Secretary of the Commonwealth of Pennsylvania, Kathy Boockvar, certified the results, and Governor Tom Wolf, in accordance with the law, signed the certificate of ascertainment for the Biden/Harris slate of electors for Biden and Harris and sent it to the Archivist of the United States.

On November 25, 2020, the Pennsylvania Senate Majority (Republican) Policy committee held a public hearing regarding the counting of ballots in this election. Trump planned to attend the meeting but he canceled the trip.

After a group of Republican congressman filed a lawsuit to stop certification on November 22, Judge Patricia McCullough ruled to halt further state certifications pending a hearing. The Pennsylvania Supreme Court ruled on November 28 to unanimously overturn Judge Patricia McCullough's ruling to halt certification. Moreover, the Pennsylvania Supreme Court also dismissed with prejudice the requests of Representative Mike Kelly and other Republicans to either invalidate all 2.5 million mail-in ballots in Pennsylvania, or to invalidate all 6.9 million ballots in the state and have the state's Republican-controlled Legislature choose the presidential electors for the state. The rationale for the decision was that the Republicans were challenging the law too late; they had been able to challenge the law since it became live in October 2019, but they only filed the lawsuit when the results of the November 2020 election were "becoming seemingly apparent". Hence, the Republicans had failed to act with "due diligence" in their handling of the case. By the time of the court's decision, the Pennsylvania election results had been certified in Biden's favor. The congressmen appealed to the US Supreme Court, but on December 8, 2020, the Supreme Court unanimously rejected the request in one sentence.

On December 31, 2020, Pennsylvania Congressman Dan Meuser (PA-9), Congressman Glenn ‘GT' Thompson (PA-15), Congressman Mike Kelly (PA-16), Congressman Scott Perry (PA-10), Congressman Lloyd Smucker (PA-11), Congressman Guy Reschenthaler (PA-14), Congressman John Joyce (PA-13), and Congressman Fred Keller (PA-12) released a statement that summarized their belief that the Pennsylvania state legislature had taken unlawful actions regarding the 2020 election process which, in their opinion, resulted in a "highly questionable and inaccurate vote total".

Objection 

On January 6, 2021, as Congress certified the Electoral College results confirming President-elect Joe Biden and Vice President-elect Kamala Harris as the winners, there was an objection to Pennsylvania's 20 electoral votes, brought forward by U.S. Representative Scott Perry of Pennsylvania's 10th congressional district and officially signed onto by U.S. Senator Josh Hawley of Missouri. The objection failed 7–92 in the Senate, and 138–282 in the House.

See also
 List of United States presidential elections in Pennsylvania
 2020 Pennsylvania elections
 2020 Democratic Party presidential primaries
 2020 Republican Party presidential primaries
 2020 United States elections
 Post-election lawsuits related to the 2020 United States presidential election

Notes
Partisan clients

Additional candidates

References

Further reading
 . (Focus on the town of Ambridge)
 . (Describes political geography of regions: Allegheny, Central, Dutch Country, Northeast, Philadelphia, Southeast, and West).
 
 . (Describes bellwether Erie County, Pennsylvania)

External links
  (state affiliate of the U.S. League of Women Voters)

Pennsylvania
2020
Presidential